Majdal (meaning "tower") may refer to:

Israel and Palestine
 al-Majdal or al-Majdal Asqalan, a Palestinian village depopulated in 1948, now part of Ashkelon in Israel
 al-Majdal, Tiberias, a Palestinian village depopulated in 1948, now in Israel, thought to be the site of ancient Magdala
 Khirbat al-Majdal, a Palestinian village depopulated in 1948, now in Israel
 al-Majdal, a Palestinian village in Haifa Subdistrict depopulated in 1925, now part of Ramat Yohanan in Israel
 Al-Mujaydil, a Palestinian village depopulated in 1948, now in Israel
 Majd al-Krum, a town in northern Israel
 Majdal Yaba, a Palestinian village depopulated in 1948, now in Israel
 Magdala, village identified with al-Majdal, near Tiberias
 Majdal Bani Fadil, a modern Palestinian village in the West Bank

Syria
 al-Majdal, Syria, a village in the Hama Governorate of Syria
 Majdal Shams, a village in the Golan Heights, currently under Israeli occupation

Lebanon
 Majadel, a village in Lebanon
 Majdal Anjar, a village in Lebanon